Alan Espínola (born 1 October 1971) is a Paraguayan swimmer. He competed in two events at the 1992 Summer Olympics.

References

1971 births
Living people
Paraguayan male swimmers
Olympic swimmers of Paraguay
Swimmers at the 1992 Summer Olympics
Place of birth missing (living people)
20th-century Paraguayan people